The Great Britain women's national American football team is the official American football senior national team of  Great Britain.

History 
The team competed at the 2015 European Championship, where they finished second after losing to Finland in the final game. They then participated in the 2017 World Championship, where they finished fourth after losing to Mexico in the bronze medal game. Great Britain hosted the 2019 European Championship, where they won a bronze medal. Great Britain forced a three-way tie with winners and runners-up Finland and Sweden, but finished third due to the tournament's tiebreakers. 

At the 2022 World Championship, Great Britain made it to the final following a winning touchdown with only two seconds to go in the game.  In doing so, Great Britain became the first European team to play in an IFAF World Championship final.

References 

Women's national American football teams
American football
American football in the United Kingdom